Guangling County is in the northeast of Shanxi province, China. It is under the administration of Datong city. Guangling is a basin surrounded by Taihang Mountains. Guangling has nine township level divisions. Famous tourist attractions include: Temple of Water God, Temple of Holy Spring, Zhao Great Wall. Local products include: papercut, millet, sunflower seeds, dry Tofu etc.

In 2001, the county was divided into two towns and seven townships.

Climate

References

 www.xzqh.org 

County-level divisions of Shanxi
Datong